Eulima mulata is a species of sea snail, a marine gastropod mollusk in the family Eulimidae. The species is one of a number within the genus Eulima.

Distribution

 Brazil coast, between Pará and Rio Grande do Sul.

Description 
The maximum recorded shell length is 16 mm.

Habitat 
Minimum recorded depth is 1 m. Maximum recorded depth is 100 m.

References

External links

mulata
Gastropods described in 1990